Oumar Ba (1906 – 1964) was a physician and politician from Niger who served in the French Senate from 1948 to 1952. He was born in Bandiagara.

References 

Oumar Ba's page on the French Senate website

Nigerien politicians
French Senators of the Fourth Republic
1906 births
1964 deaths
Senators of French West Africa